Angas Street is a main street in the Adelaide city centre, South Australia. The rear of St Aloysius College faces the street, and various law courts are on the street, including the Dame Roma Mitchell Building. The South Australia Police headquarters and South Australian Metropolitan Fire Service Adelaide station are further down the street.

Angas Street runs from the southern end of Victoria Square to East Terrace.

History
The street is named after George Fife Angas in recognition of his chairmanship of the South Australian Company.

Angas Street was the site of the Municipal Tramways Trust depot from 1923 until 1986, on the north side not far from Victoria Square. At its largest, the depot had 19 tram tracks entering, all from facing east. There was never a tram route along Angas Street; entry and exit from the depot required shunting on a dead end stub of track in Angas Street.

Notable buildings
 Dame Roma Mitchell Building, Commonwealth Law Courts, no. 1-15
Kodo Apartments, no. 29, designed by Woods Bagot and at the time slated to be the tallest residential block in the city, at 30 storeys
Royalty Theatre, no. 65,  owned and managed by the Calisthenic Association of SA
Adelaide City Seventh-day Adventist Church, no. 82
South Australia Police (SAPOL) headquarters, no. 100
Calvary Adelaide Hospital 
 SA Water building
WEA building, no. 223
 Dom Polski Centre, or Polish Club, no. 230
The Life Christian Centre, or Life Church, at no. 245 was founded in 1967 to minister to Italian-speaking Adelaideans following a Pentecostal movement in the United States called Christian Church of North America. In 1979, the Christian Church in Australia (CCA) was established, with links to CCNA. CCA has since grown, with churches being founded around Australia. The church bought the building housing the Bakehouse Theatre at no. 255 in 2020.

The Arts Theatre

The Arts Theatre is at no. 53. It is home to the Adelaide Repertory Theatre, which had the theatre built in 1963. The 500-seat theatre was built for £45,000, on land bought 15 years prior by the long-running amateur theatre company. It has since become a major venue for other amateur companies as well as Adelaide Fringe and other performances. It hosts around 14 shows per year.

Bakehouse Theatre 

The building at no. 255 started life as Lovell's Bakery in the 1890s. It was subsequently used as the bookshop of the Adelaide branch of the Communist Party of Australia, and for a while was home to Farmer’s Radio and Suburban Taxis. In the 1970s, Keith Gallasch  (who went on to found RealTime magazine with his partner Virginia Baxter ) and David Allen, then both lecturers at the Salisbury College of Advanced Education, formed a theatre group comprising some of their students, called Troupe. They rented the warehouse-like building, calling it The Red Shed, which spawned a new theatre company, the Red Shed company, which later moved to Unley. The Troupe collective grew, and performed new Australian works, including some penned by Gallasch.

In the 1990s Peter Green took over, renting the property at a low rent from the Communist Party, and renovated the old theatre, reopening it as The Bakehouse Theatre in 1997. Arts SA provided some funding until 2006, when Pamela Munt and her daughter Melanie took over the theatre for their Unseen Theatre Company, which specialises in works by Terry Pratchett.  The theatre was expanded to include a second performance space, and played host to a number of resident theatre companies as well as Adelaide Fringe shows. The theatre hosted more than 250 shows, including British comedian Ben Elton. 

In early 2022, the theatre was given notice to vacate the building by its new owners, the Life Christian Centre. The theatre closed after its final run of A Streetcar Named Desire on 7 May 2022.

Junction list

See also

References

Streets in Adelaide